Murray Rae (born 19 January 1939) is a New Zealand sailor. He competed in the Flying Dutchman event at the 1960 Summer Olympics.

References

External links
 

1939 births
Living people
New Zealand male sailors (sport)
Olympic sailors of New Zealand
Sailors at the 1960 Summer Olympics – Flying Dutchman
Sportspeople from Auckland